Claire Mulligan is a Canadian novelist and short story writer, whose debut novel The Reckoning of Boston Jim was a longlisted nominee for the Scotiabank Giller Prize in 2007, and a shortlisted finalist for the Ethel Wilson Fiction Prize in 2008.

Her second novel, The Dark, was published in 2013. She has also published short stories in The Antigonish Review, Grain, The Tulane Review and Canadian Author.

Originally from Kelowna, British Columbia, she currently resides on Vancouver Island, where she teaches in the continuing education program at Camosun College and is pursuing a master's degree in screenwriting at the University of Victoria.

References

21st-century Canadian novelists
21st-century Canadian short story writers
Canadian women novelists
Canadian women short story writers
Canadian historical novelists
People from Kelowna
Writers from British Columbia
Living people
21st-century Canadian women writers
Year of birth missing (living people)